Vaccinium species are used as food plants by the larvae of a number of Lepidoptera species, including:

Monophagous
Species which feed exclusively on Vaccinium

 Coleophoridae
 Several Coleophora case-bearer species:
 C. glitzella – only on lingonberry (V. vitis-idaea)
 C. idaeella – only on lingonberry (V. vitis-idaea)
 C. murinella
 C. uliginosella – only on bog bilberry (V. uliginosum)
 C. vaccinivorella
 C. vitisella – only on lingonberry (V. vitis-idaea)

Polyphagous
Species which feed on Vaccinium and other plants

 Coleophoridae
 Several Coleophora case-bearer species:
 C. plumbella – recorded on bog bilberry (V. uliginosum)
 C. vacciniella
 Gelechiidae
 Chionodes viduella – recorded on bog bilberry (V. uliginosum)
 Geometridae
 Alcis repandata (mottled beauty)
 Chloroclysta truncata (common marbled carpet)
 Crocallis elinguaria (scalloped oak)
 Ectropis crepuscularia (engrailed)
 Epirrita autumnata (autumnal moth)
 Eupithecia succenturiata (bordered pug) – recorded on bilberry (V. myrtillus)
 Eupithecia vulgata (common pug) – recorded on bilberry (V. myrtillus)
 Itame argillacearia (blueberry spanworm) – recorded on lowbush blueberry (V. angustifolium) and others
 Hemithea aestivaria (common emerald)
 Odontopera bidentata (scalloped hazel) – recorded on bilberry (V. myrtillus)
 Noctuidae
 Diarsia mendica (ingrailed clay)
 Diarsia rubi (small square-spot)
 Melanchra persicariae (dot moth) – recorded on bilberry (V. myrtillus)
 Orthosia gothica (Hebrew character) – recorded on bilberry (V. myrtillus)
 Xestia c-nigrum (setaceous Hebrew character)
 Pyralidae
 Endotricha flammealis
 Saturniidae
 Pavonia pavonia (emperor moth)

External links 

Vaccinium
+Lepidoptera